Eastern District may refer to:

Government 
 Eastern District, Hong Kong
 Eastern District of Taipei
 Eastern District, American Samoa
 Eastern District, Upper Canada
 Eastern District (General Junta of Asturias constituency), Spain
 Eastern District, the early name for Williamsburg, Brooklyn
 Multiple United States district courts:
 United States District Court for the Eastern District of Arkansas
 United States District Court for the Eastern District of California
 United States District Court for the Eastern District of Kentucky
 United States District Court for the Eastern District of Louisiana
 United States District Court for the Eastern District of Michigan
 United States District Court for the Eastern District of Oklahoma
 United States District Court for the Eastern District of Pennsylvania
 United States District Court for the Eastern District of New York
 United States District Court for the Eastern District of North Carolina
 United States District Court for the Eastern District of Tennessee
 United States District Court for the Eastern District of Texas
 United States District Court for the Eastern District of Virginia
 United States District Court for the Eastern District of Washington
 United States District Court for the Eastern District of Wisconsin

Military 
 Eastern Command (United Kingdom), an organisational unit of the British Army in England 1793–1968
 Eastern District (British Army), a district command of the British Army 1967–1995

Other uses
 Eastern District (LCMS), in the Lutheran Church–Missouri Synod
 Eastern District (VHSL), in the Virginia High School League

See also
 East District (disambiguation)
 For Eastern Districts in East Asian languages, see 東區 (disambiguation)
 For Eastern Districts (ku) in Japanese cites, see Higashi-ku (disambiguation)
 For Eastern Districts (gu) in Korean cites, see Dong-gu (disambiguation)

District name disambiguation pages